The Gandhi Stadium at the Gandhi Sports Complex Ground is located in the city of Amritsar, Punjab, India.

It is currently used for Cricket matches.  The stadium was built in 1933, when it was known as the Alexandra Ground. It is currently used as the home ground for two Indian domestic cricket team, Punjab and North Zone. The stadium has hosted 2 ODI matches with the host team - India winning both of these matches.

One Day International cricket

The stadium has hosted following ODI matches till date.

Game Statistics:
{| class="wikitable"
|-
! Category
! Information
|-
| Highest Team Score
|  India (269/7 in 50 Overs against Sri Lanka)
|-
| Lowest Team Score
| New Zealand (145 All-out in 44.1 Overs against India)
|-
| Best Batting Performance
| Nathan Astle (59 Runs against India)
|-
| Best Bowling Performance
| Manoj Prabhakar (5/33 against New Zealand)
|}

International cricket five-wicket hauls

Key

ODIs

References

External links
 Cricinfo Website - Ground Page
 Cricketaarchive Website - Ground Page

Cricket grounds in Punjab, India
Buildings and structures in Amritsar
Sports venues in Punjab, India
Sports venues completed in 1933
1933 establishments in India
20th-century architecture in India